Balaenoptera siberi is an extinct species of baleen whale from the Late Miocene, described by Pilleri and Pilleri in 1989, based on fossils found in the Pisco Formation of the Pisco Basin in southwestern Peru.

Description 
The baleen whale fossils comprise a complete skeleton, including the skull, baleen, mandibles, flippers, and vertebral column. The holotype fossils are housed in a private collection, belonging to Allejandro Pezzia Asserto, while a paratype is stored in the Staatliches Museum für Naturkunde in Stuttgart, Germany.

Age 
Fossils of the species were found in two different locations in the Pisco Formation; Aguada de Lomas, and Sacaco (SAO horizon). At time of description of the species, the sediments at Aguada de Loma ranged in age from the Late Miocene to Late Pliocene, with the layer the fossils were found dated to about 8 Ma (Huayquerian). Subsequent dating of the sediments by Marx and Fordyce in 2015 gave a late Tortonian to early Messinian range of 7.0 to 8.0 Ma.

The sediments at Sacaco were previously thought to be early Late Pliocene (3.9 Ma), while Ehret et al. in 2012 defined a Messinian age of more than 5.75 Ma for this unit of the Pisco Formation.

Paleoecology 
The Pisco Formation has provided many fossils of marine mammals, including several toothed whales (Acrophyseter, Koristocetus, Scaphokogia, Livyatan and more), other baleen whales (Incakujira, Miocaperea and Piscobalaena, among others), porpoises (Lomacetus and Piscolithax), seals (Hadrokirus, Piscophoca and Australophoca), marine (Hemisyntrachelus) and river dolphins (Brachydelphis and Brujadelphis), and the swimming sloth Thalassocnus. Additionally, fossil penguins and other birds (such as Pelagornis) and shark teeth, among others of megalodon, were found in the fossiliferous Pisco Formation.

References

Bibliography

Further reading 
 G. Pilleri. 1989. Balaenoptera siberi, ein neuer spatmiozaner bartenwal aus der Pisco-formation Perus. Beitrage zur Palaontologie der Cetaceen Perus 65-84

Baleen whales
Prehistoric cetaceans
Messinian life
Tortonian life
Miocene mammals of South America
Huayquerian
Montehermosan
Neogene Peru
Fossils of Peru
Pisco Formation
Fossil taxa described in 1989